Broadbent Arena is a 6,600 seat multi-purpose arena in Louisville, Kentucky. It was home to the Louisville Icehawks and Louisville RiverFrogs ECHL teams.  The arena, along with Cardinal Stadium and Freedom Hall, is located on the grounds of the Kentucky Exposition Center in Louisville.  The arena is used for equestrian events, and other fairground type activities. As of January 2021, the arena is being used as a major distribution site for COVID-19 vaccines.

See also
 Sports in Louisville, Kentucky

References

Indoor ice hockey venues in the United States
Sports venues in Louisville, Kentucky
Indoor soccer venues in the United States